Stomopteryx credula is a moth of the family Gelechiidae. It was described by Edward Meyrick in 1927. It is found in Zimbabwe.

The wingspan is about 17 mm. The forewings are pale ochreous. The stigmata are black, with the plical very obliquely before the first discal. The hindwings are pale grey.

References

Moths described in 1927
Stomopteryx